The Opposition in the Australian Northern Territory usually consists of the largest party not in Government. The Opposition's purpose is to hold the Government to account and constitute a "Government-in-waiting" should the existing Government fall. To that end, a Leader of the Opposition and Shadow Ministers for the various government departments question the Premier and Ministers on Government policy and administration and formulate the policy the Opposition would pursue in Government.

At times, the Opposition consisted of both the Australian Labor Party (ALP) and Coalition counterparts, the Country Liberal Party (CLP).

The current Leader of the Opposition is CLP Leader Lia Finocchiaro.

Current Shadow Ministry
Source:

References

External links
 Northern Territory Electoral Commission
 ABC Elections: 2016 Northern Territory Election

Elections in the Northern Territory
2010s in the Northern Territory